The 2012 Melon Music Awards were held on Friday, December 14, 2012, at the Olympic Gymnastics Arena in Seoul, South Korea. Organized by Kakao M through its online music store Melon, the 2012 ceremony was the event's fourth edition since its offline launch in 2009. The award winners were determined by combining digital sales data and voting conducted by netizens online.

The 2012 ceremony was the show's largest ceremony at the time, attracting an audience of over 11,000 people. It was directed under the theme of "Music is Healing" and was broadcast live globally via YouTube as well as cable television channels domestically. 

Psy was the most nominated and awarded act of the night, where he won four awards including Song of the Year with "Gangnam Style", Global Artist, Top 10 Artist and Best Music Video. Beast and Busker Busker were awarded with Artist of the Year and Album of the Year, respectively. B.A.P and Ailee additionally won the Best New Artist Awards.

Performers

Winners and nominees

Main awards 
Winners and nominees are listed below. Winners are listed first and emphasized in bold.

Other awards

References

External links 

 Official website

2012 music awards
Melon Music Awards ceremonies
Annual events in South Korea